is a Japanese comedian, singer, television presenter, and radio personality. Kaminuma is one of the leading broadcast personalities in the Kansai region. She has often appeared in Kansai local programs, and has garnered high ratings since the late 1990s.

She is married with two children. Kaminuma's husband is Shinpei Kaminuma, a Kansai Telecasting Corporation (KTV) television director, producer, executive director, and production director, as well as Media Pulpo (KTV's subsidiary) representative director and chairman.  Kaminuma is represented by her agency, Kaminuma Jimusho. She dropped out of Empire Girls High School Owada School (now Osaka International Waseda High School).

Current appearances
From the end of September 2013 Kaminuma made regular appearances in her own television programs.

Former appearances

Radio

Advertisements

Films

Discography

Bibliography

References

Notes

Japanese women comedians
Japanese women television presenters
1955 births
Living people
People from Hyōgo Prefecture